Falsomordellina luteoloides is a species of beetle in the genus Falsomordellina. It was described in 1961.

References

Beetles described in 1961
Mordellidae